TM6SF2 is the Transmembrane 6 superfamily 2 human gene which codes for a protein by the same name. This gene is otherwise called KIAA1926. Its exact function is currently unknown.

Location
TM6SF2 is located on chromosome 19 precisely at locus 19p13.3-p12. It is flanked by SUGP1 (a SURP and G-Patch Domain-Containing protein thought to play a role in pre-mRNA splicing ) and HAPLN4 (a hyaluronan and proteoglycan link protein 4 that binds to hyaluronic acid and may be involved in formation of the extracellular matrix ) genes upstream and downstream respectively.

Evolutionary aspects

Orthologs
TM6SF2 is a moderately conserved gene. There exist orthologs in several phyla as far diverged as invertebrates. 82 organisms have been identified as having orthologs of this gene. The most distant orthologs of TM6SF2 are in zebra fish (Danio rerio) and the deer tick (Ixodes scapularis). Below is a summary table of some of the gene orthologs obtained from the NCBI database.

Paralogs
TM6SF1 has been identified as a paralog of TM6SF2 in humans  about which little is known.

Homologous domains
The domain of unknown function DUF2781 is highly conserved across homologs. DUF2781 belongs to the pfam10914 family which comprises uncharacterized eukaryotic proteins, some of which are membrane proteins

mRNA
The RNA product is 1483 base pairs long and is spliced alternatively to yield seven different isoforms (alternative mRNAs a - f with form a being the most abundant) with varying combinations of the 10 identified exons. The microRNA miR-1343 binds to a 3’ UTR site called 7mer-m8 (as predicted by TargetScan).

Folding patterns
The 5' and 3' UTR regions of the mRNA show some stem loop formation for stability. Much of this chemistry appears to be taking place in the 5' region which has three stem loops compared to the 3' region with only one.

Exons and introns
There are ten different exons and the ones expressed depend on how alternative splicing proceeds. There are four alternative polyadenylation sites present.

Promoter region
The promoter for this gene is upstream and spans bases 19383923 to 19384700 (778 bp long) on the minus strand of chromosome 19. There exist several transcription factors capable of binding to this promoter region including cAMP responsive element binding protein, SMAD3, KLF3, EGR1, SOX/SRY, PAX2/PAX5 and two SNP regions have been identified as well. The transcription factors predicted to bind the TM6SF2 promoter suggest this protein functions in growth and tumor regulation as well as sex determination to a lesser extent.

Protein
The TM6SF2 protein contains 377 amino acids and is 42,554 Da large with an isoelectric point of about 7.7.

Domains and motifs
There is a domain of unknown function, DUF2781 ( pfam10914 family) spanning amino acids 218 to 359 in the C-terminus of the protein.
There are nine transmembrane regions in this protein. The first one contains the signal peptide which is eventually cleaved following protein localization to the ER. A terminal KHHQ sequence is an endoplasmic reticulum retention signal.

Secondary structure
Several alpha helices and beta strands are formed by the mature protein with as many as thirteen helices (including transmembrane helices) and fifteen beta sheets predicted.

3° and 4° structure
The protein side groups in this protein do not necessarily interact in a manner to form tertiary and quaternary structures. The cysteines present are not predicted to form stable disulfide bonds.

Post-translational modifications
Two main post-translational modifications occur; phosphorylation at tyrosine, serine and tryptophan sites and two low probability sumoylation sites.

Expression patterns
In humans, TM6SF2 expression has been documented in the adult stage only specifically in the intestine and liver in moderate amounts as well as embryonic tissue and ovary at low levels. Other sources indicate expression in brain, lung, testis, stomach, heart, colon, kidney and adipose tissue.

Protein subcellular localization studies with confocal microscopy demonstrated that TM6SF2 is localized in the endoplasmic reticulum and the ER-Golgi intermediate compartment of human liver cells.

Protein interactions
No known protein-protein interactions have been established thus far.

Clinical significance

In a study that used pre-made kits to predict cardiac allograft rejection using peripheral blood only, graft rejection was associated with decreased levels of TM6SF2 expression, alongside other genes.

A variant TM6SF2 gene causes susceptibility to nonalcoholic fatty liver disease due to impaired very low density lipoprotein (VLDL) production14.

TM6SF2 inhibition was associated with reduced secretion of TG-rich lipoproteins (TRLs) and increased cellular TG concentration and lipid droplet content, whereas TM6SF2 overexpression reduced liver cell steatosis. TM6SF2 is a regulator of liver fat metabolism with opposing effects on the secretion of TRLs and hepatic lipid droplet content.

References